Sion D. Brinn (born 8 May 1973; pronounced "Sean") is a Jamaica-born former competition swimmer.

Swimming career
He represented Jamaica and then Great Britain in international competition. He swam for Jamaica at the 1996 Summer Olympics; and for Great Britain at the 2000 Summer Olympics. He won the 1998 ASA National Championship 100 metres freestyle title.

Coaching career
As of 2016, he is the head coach of the swimming and diving teams at Indian River State College in Fort Pierce, Florida.  He was previously the head coach of the swimming and diving team at Wright State University in Dayton, Ohio.

See also
List of Jamaican records in swimming

References

Brinn's coach's bio at Wright State University.

1973 births
Living people
Jamaican male swimmers
British male swimmers
English people of Jamaican descent
Wright State Raiders swimming coaches
Jamaican swimming coaches
LSU Tigers swimmers
British male freestyle swimmers
Medalists at the FINA World Swimming Championships (25 m)
Olympic swimmers of Jamaica
Olympic swimmers of Great Britain
Sportspeople from Kingston, Jamaica
Swimmers at the 1996 Summer Olympics
Swimmers at the 2000 Summer Olympics
Commonwealth Games competitors for Jamaica
Swimmers at the 1994 Commonwealth Games
Wright State Raiders coaches